Miss Fire is a Pakistani sitcom about two unconventional couples. The show is written by Muhammad Younis Butt and directed by Fawad Wyne. The characters are portrayed by Sami Khan, Aqdas Waseem, Mehar Bano and Kiran Haq.

It was released on 25 October 2013 on Geo Entertainment. Miss Fire's last episode was aired on 9 May 2014.

Plot 
Miss Fire is the story of two happily married sisters (Mona and Momi living a satisfactory life with their husbands (Jamal and Sherry)  until their eldest sister (Maya) drops in to live with them. The husbands assume that she will destroy their domestic lives and want to get rid of her.

Episode 1 (Maya's entry) 
On the episode 1 of Miss Fire, Jamal and Sherry buy tickets for Pakistan cricket match. When Jamal and Sherry go out from the gate, the eldest sister of Mona and Momi, Maya comes and surprises them. Sherry and Jamal's cricket plan is cancelled.

Episode 1-21 (Maya) 
On episode 1, Maya came to Sherry and Jamal's house to live with them. On each episode of Miss Fire, Sherry and Jamal are scared from Maya assuming that she will destroy their lives. Episode 21 was the last episode of Maya.

Episode 23-27 (Jeeni) 
On episode 23, Mona and Momi's cousin Jeeni comes to airport. She then leaves for Mona and Momi's home in a rickshaw. However, the rickshaw stops and Sherry and Jamal take Jeeni to a restaurant. Sherry and Jamal stole Jeeni's bag. At the time, Sherry and Jamal didn't know that Jeeni was the cousin of Mona and Momi. Later on Jeeni comes to the house. She then gets to know that Sherry and Jamal are the husbands of Mona and Momi.

Cast

Main characters 

 Sami Khan as Sherry
 Aqdas Waseem as Jamal
 Mehar Bano as Mona
 Kiran Haq as Momi
 Saba Qamar as Maya (Episode 1-21)
Fiza Ali as Jeeni (Episode 23-27)

Guest appearance 

 Qaiser Piya as an actor (Episode 4)
 Nawaz Anjum as Ghafoor (Episode 13)

References 

Pakistani television sitcoms
Pakistani drama television series
Comedy-drama television series
Urdu-language television shows
2013 Pakistani television series debuts
2010s Pakistani television series